Johannes Martini (9 June 1866, in Chemnitz – 7 February 1935, in Munich) was a German oil painter and graphic artist.

Biography
Martini was born in Chemnitz, Saxony. He was a student of Franz Skarbina at the Akademie der Künste of Berlin, and he spent two years at the Académie Julian in Paris. Martini exhibited his work at the Great Art Exhibition in Berlin and the Paris Salon. He participated in the jubilee exhibit for the 90th birthday of Luitpold of Bavaria, as well as the Annual Exhibition in Berlin's Glass Palace.

Martini spent much of his life in Munich, Bavaria, and lived in the city district of Schwabing. He was married and had one son.

Many of Martini's paintings are considered missing. A considerable part of his estate in the form of letters is dispersed among the private citizens of Munich.

Martini was a member of the German Art Cooperative (Allgemeinen Deutschen Kunstgenossenschaft or AdK) and the Munich art community. He was also a member of the Reichsverband bildendener Künstler (RVbK, "Reich Union for Visual Artists") and had many contacts, including with the Krupp and Siemens families and the Vatican.

Gallery

Sources
Biography @ the Galerie Bernd Dürr

External links

More works by Martini @ the Galerie Bernd Dürr

1866 births
1935 deaths
Académie Julian alumni
19th-century German painters
19th-century German male artists
German male painters
20th-century German painters
20th-century German male artists
People from Chemnitz